Oxfordshire County Council is elected every four years.

Political control
Since the first election to the shadow authority in 1973 ahead of the reforms which came into force in 1974, political control of the council has been as follows:

Leadership
The leaders of the council since 2001 have been:

Council elections
1973 Oxfordshire County Council election
1977 Oxfordshire County Council election
1981 Oxfordshire County Council election
1985 Oxfordshire County Council election
1989 Oxfordshire County Council election
1993 Oxfordshire County Council election
1997 Oxfordshire County Council election
2001 Oxfordshire County Council election
2005 Oxfordshire County Council election
2009 Oxfordshire County Council election
2013 Oxfordshire County Council election
2017 Oxfordshire County Council election
2021 Oxfordshire County Council election

Election results

County result maps

By-election results

1997-2001

2001-2005

2005-2009

2009-2013

2013-2017

2017-2021

2021-2025

References

External links
Oxfordshire County Council

 
Elections
County council elections in England
Elections
Council elections in Oxfordshire